An Impartial Hand is a pen name or attribution used by several authors, notably:

 Samuel Johnson
 Thomas Cox (topographer) (disputed)
 John Foxe

It is also used as a characterization, for example by:

 Sir Samuel Tuke, 1st Baronet